Edholm is an unincorporated community in Butler County, Nebraska, United States.

History
A post office was established at Edholm in 1892, and remained in operation until it was discontinued in 1933.

References

Unincorporated communities in Butler County, Nebraska
Unincorporated communities in Nebraska